Naduvikurichi is a village in the Pattukkottai taluk of Thanjavur district, Tamil Nadu, India.

Demographics 

As per the 2001 census, Naduvikurichi had a total population of 467 with 223 males and 244 females. The sex ratio was 1094. The literacy rate was 79.91.

References 

 

Villages in Thanjavur district